is a Japanese fencer. She competed in the women's individual and team foil events at the 1976 Summer Olympics.

References

External links
 

1953 births
Living people
Japanese female foil fencers
Olympic fencers of Japan
Fencers at the 1976 Summer Olympics
Asian Games medalists in fencing
Fencers at the 1974 Asian Games
Asian Games silver medalists for Japan
Medalists at the 1974 Asian Games
20th-century Japanese women
21st-century Japanese women